Hafr Al-Batin College of Technology is a technical college that was established in Hafar al-Batin, Saudi Arabia in 2005. It specializes in areas such as computer programming and electronics.  It educates some 700 students.

External links
 

2005 establishments in Saudi Arabia
Educational institutions established in 2005
Universities and colleges in Saudi Arabia